Stoke Heath is an area in the south of Bromsgrove, Worcestershire, England.

Originally a small village near Bromsgrove, it has been absorbed into Bromsgrove by new housing developments since the 1980s.  These developments hold many of the commuters that have made Bromsgrove into a dormitory town; it is within commuting distance of both Birmingham and Worcester.

Stoke Heath features Avoncroft Museum of Historic Buildings.

Villages in Worcestershire
Bromsgrove